Thomas Knight Finletter (November 11, 1893 – April 24, 1980) was an American lawyer, politician, and statesman.

Early life
Finletter was born in Philadelphia, Pennsylvania, the son of Thomas Dickson Finletter and Helen Grill Finletter. He was the grandson of Thomas K. Finletter, for whom the Thomas K. Finletter School in Philadelphia is named.

He took his early education at The Episcopal Academy in Philadelphia and graduated from the University of Pennsylvania with both Bachelor of Arts degree in 1915 and bachelor of laws in 1920. He also served as editor-in-chief of the University of Pennsylvania Law Review.

Career
In World War I, he served with the 312th Field Artillery advancing to the rank of captain. He was admitted to the Pennsylvania bar in 1920 and the New York Bar in 1921.

Finletter practiced law in New York until he began his government service in 1941, as a special assistant to Secretary of State Cordell Hull on international economic affairs. In 1943, he was appointed executive director and later deputy director of the Office of Foreign Economic Coordinator (OFEC). In this post, he was in charge of planning economic activities related to liberated areas and was in control of matters of foreign exchange and matters relating to the operations of the Alien Property Custodian. Finletter resigned his post in 1944, when the functions of OFEC were absorbed by the newly created Foreign Economic Administration.

In 1945, Finletter acted as consultant at the United Nations Conference on International Organization at San Francisco.

In the same year he was a cosigner of the "Declaration of the Dublin, N.H., Conference", a declaration on world peace issued by the Dublin Conference on World Peace. The declaration stated that the United Nations was inadequate to maintain world peace, and advocated a world federal government.

He returned back to public service July 18, 1947, when President Harry S. Truman established a temporary, five-man commission that inquired into all phases of aviation and drafted the national air policy report. This commission was sometimes known as "The Finletter Commission". Finletter served as chairman of the Air Policy Commission which, on January 1, 1948, sent to the president the report entitled "Survival in the Air Age."

Finletter was chief of the Economic Cooperation Administration's mission to the United Kingdom with headquarters in London, to which he had been appointed early in 1949.

Secretary of the Air Force
President Truman appointed Finletter as the second Secretary of the Air Force succeeding Stuart Symington on April 24, 1950, in which office he served until January 20, 1953.

In 1958, Finletter was a candidate for the Democratic nomination for the U.S. Senate from New York. He won the support of some liberal reformers, prominently including Eleanor Roosevelt, and was chosen as the Liberal Party's candidate, though the Democratic Convention preferred Frank Hogan. Finletter then withdrew from the Liberal ticket, endorsing Hogan.

Diplomatic service
President John F. Kennedy appointed Finletter to be the Ambassador to NATO to succeed William Henry Draper Jr. in 1961. He served in that office until 1965 when he was replaced by Harlan Cleveland.

Later life
In 1965, following his term as Ambassador to NATO, he retired from government service and returned to his law practice with the firm of Coudert Brothers, in New York City. In January 1967, he approached Senator Eugene McCarthy to see if he was interested in challenging Lyndon Johnson for the 1968 Democratic nomination for president, on the issue of the Vietnam War. McCarthy did go on to challenge Johnson, but failed to win the Democratic nomination. Finletter died on April 24, 1980.

Book
Interim Report on the U.S. Search for a Substitute for Isolation, W.W. Norton & Co., Inc., New York: 1968

Political and Professional Affiliations
Americans for Democratic Action
Council on Foreign Relations
United World Federalists
Delta Phi

See also
Pace-Finletter MOU 1952

Notes

References

The Truman Library
The Political Graveyard
U.S. Air Force, The Air and Space Power Journal
Declaration of the Dublin, N.H., Conference
Television News Archive, Vanderbilt University

External links
 

|-

1893 births
1980 deaths
United States Secretaries of the Air Force
Truman administration personnel
Permanent Representatives of the United States to NATO
United States Air Force officers
Episcopal Academy alumni
University of Pennsylvania Law School alumni
United States Army personnel of World War I
New York (state) lawyers
Pennsylvania lawyers
Lawyers from Philadelphia